The , also known as the  ("box ") or  ("board "), is a traditional Japanese three-stringed plucked instrument, often considered either a relative or derivative of the , itself a relative of the .

Differences

The 's musical repertoire is often light and cheerful, including many folk songs.

References

Japanese musical instruments